Ab Maik-e Golzari (also Romanized as Āb Mā’īk-e Golzārī; also known as Golzārī) is a village in Dasht-e Lali Rural District, in the Central District of Lali County, Khuzestan Province, Iran. At the 2006 census, its population was 61, in 10 families.

References 

Populated places in Lali County